Henrique Adriano Buss (born 14 October 1986), simply known as Henrique, is a Brazilian professional footballer who plays as a central defender for Coritiba. He has played for the Brazil national team, making his debut in 2008 and being included among the 23-man list for the 2014 FIFA World Cup.

His main asset is his versatility, as he can play as a central defender, right back or defensive midfielder.

Club career

Coritiba and Palmeiras
Henrique started his career at Coritiba in his home region. In 2008, he was bought by Palmeiras in a deal partially financed by Traffic Group. Part of the later transfer fee of Henrique from Barcelona was credited to Desportivo Brasil, the subsidiary of Traffic and re-distributed by Desportivo to Palmeiras.

Barcelona
Dutch club Ajax were said to have tabled a bid for Henrique in June 2008, which was soon followed by a report saying he had agreed terms with Barcelona. In the end, Barcelona had secured Henrique's services from Palmeiras for €8 million, with an extra €2 million in bonuses. He signed a five-year deal and was to be immediately loaned out to German Bundesliga side Bayer Leverkusen. The transfer to Barça was officially completed a day later. Henrique made 27 league appearances in his season with Leverkusen and reached the final of the 2008–09 DFB-Pokal. He returned to Barcelona in June 2009, being given the number 23 shirt upon his return. On 31 August 2009, he was again loaned out, this time to Racing de Santander. The loan was renewed for a second year on 26 July 2010.

Barcelona wrote-down €1.757 million for the residual contract value of Henrique for the 2010–11 season.

Palmeiras
On 15 July 2011, Henrique returned to Brazil on another loan deal from Barcelona. During the 2012 Copa do Brasil campaign, coach Luiz Felipe Scolari started playing Henrique as a holding midfielder and the player thrived in the new role, with Palmeiras eventually winning the competition.

On 2 June 2012, Barcelona cancelled Henrique's contract, prompting his release from the club. He then joined Palmeiras on a free transfer after a successful loan spell in 2011–12. Palmeiras, however, remained the holder of 80% of Henrique's economic rights, with 20% of any future transfer fee to be paid to unknown parties. Henrique also became second captain of the squad, behind dead-ball specialist Marcos Assunção in the pecking order.

Napoli
On 30 January 2014, Henrique officially signed with Italian Serie A club Napoli. The deal was completed for €4 million with the player agreeing to a three-and-a-half-year contract. He played all 90 minutes of their 3–1 victory over Fiorentina in the 2014 Coppa Italia Final on 3 May.

Fluminense
On 11 January 2016, Henrique joined Fluminense on a three-year contract.

International career
On 21 March 2008, Henrique received his first call up to the Brazil national team after centre back Juan was cut from the squad due to an injury to his ankle.

On 16 April 2013, Henrique was called up by Luiz Felipe Scolari, his former coach at Palmeiras, for a friendly against Chile on 24 April at the Mineirão. But on 19 April, as Palmeiras would play against Tijuana the next day, Henrique was cut from the list, and Rodrigo Moledo of Internacional was called up in his place. On the same day, Conmebol had moved the Palmeiras game and Henrique was recalled, but Moledo was nonetheless kept on the list.

On 7 May 2014, Henrique was selected as part of the Brazil squad for the upcoming World Cup, to be played on home soil.

His sole appearance at the tournament was the final two minutes of the quarter-final victory over Colombia, replacing the injured forward Neymar, as Brazil eventually finished fourth.

Career statistics

Club

International

Honours
Coritiba;
Campeonato Brasileiro Série B: 2007
Paraná State Championship: 2022
Palmeiras
São Paulo State Championship: 2008
Copa do Brasil: 2012
Campeonato Brasileiro Série B: 2013

Napoli
Coppa Italia: 2013–14
Supercoppa Italiana: 2014

Corinthians
Campeonato Paulista: 2018, 2019

Individual
 Campeonato Carioca Team of the year: 2017

References

External links

1986 births
Living people
Brazilian people of German descent
Brazilian footballers
Association football defenders
Campeonato Brasileiro Série A players
Campeonato Brasileiro Série B players
Coritiba Foot Ball Club players
Sociedade Esportiva Palmeiras players
Fluminense FC players
Sport Club Corinthians Paulista players
La Liga players
FC Barcelona players
Racing de Santander players
Bundesliga players
Bayer 04 Leverkusen players
Serie A players
S.S.C. Napoli players
UAE Pro League players
Al-Ittihad Kalba SC players
Primeira Liga players
Belenenses SAD players
2014 FIFA World Cup players
Brazil international footballers
Brazilian expatriate footballers
Brazilian expatriate sportspeople in Germany
Brazilian expatriate sportspeople in Italy
Brazilian expatriate sportspeople in Portugal
Brazilian expatriate sportspeople in Spain
Brazilian expatriate sportspeople in the United Arab Emirates
Expatriate footballers in Germany
Expatriate footballers in Italy
Expatriate footballers in Portugal
Expatriate footballers in Spain
Expatriate footballers in the United Arab Emirates